Chaochih Liu (born February 10, 1993) is a Taiwanese-American figure skater who competed internationally for Taiwan in ladies singles. She is the 2009 Taiwanese national champion and qualified to the free skate at three ISU Championships.

Personal life 
Liu was born on February 10, 1993, in the United States. She is currently a student at the University of Minnesota and coaches aspiring figure skaters in the United States. Liu enjoys playing the piano and guitar in her free time. She also works in a plant genetics research lab under the Department of Agronomy and Plant Genetics. She went to Cheyenne Mountain High School and speaks fluent Mandarin Chinese. Her grandfather was in the restaurant business in Zhongli, Taiwan before moving the family to Iowa City, Iowa. Her mother was a math professor at the University of Iowa before relocating to Colorado Springs, Colorado for better training. Liu has two younger sisters, Chelsea, who represented the United States and China in pairs, and Cheyenne.

Skating career 
Liu started skating at the age of seven. She competed on the national level in the United States where she placed 11th at the 2007 U.S. Championships on the junior level.

In 2008 Liu began representing Taiwan. She made her debut on the international scene at the 2008 Junior Grand Prix Mexico City competition. Liu made her senior debut at the 2009 Four Continents Championships in Vancouver, British Columbia, Canada where she finished 19th. Later that season, she competed at the 2009 World Championships in Los Angeles where she finished 28th.

Competitive highlights

Programs

References

External links 

 

1993 births
Living people
Sportspeople from Colorado
Taiwanese female single skaters
American sportswomen
21st-century American women